In mathematics, especially in the field of representation theory, Schur functors (named after Issai Schur) are certain functors from the category of modules over a fixed commutative ring to itself. They generalize the constructions of exterior powers and symmetric powers of a vector space. Schur functors are indexed by Young diagrams in such a way that the horizontal diagram with n cells corresponds to the nth symmetric power functor, and the vertical diagram with n cells corresponds to the nth exterior power functor. If a vector space V is a representation of a group G, then  also has a natural action of G for any Schur functor .

Definition 
Schur functors are indexed by partitions and are described as follows. Let R be a commutative ring, E an R-module
and λ a partition of a positive integer n. Let T be a Young tableau of shape λ, thus indexing the factors of the n-fold direct product, E × E × ... × E, with the boxes of T. Consider those maps of R-modules  satisfying the following conditions

(1)  is multilinear,

(2)  is alternating in the entries indexed by each column of T,

(3)  satisfies an exchange condition stating that if  are  numbers from column i of T then

 

where the sum is over n-tuples x'  obtained from x by exchanging the elements indexed by I with any  elements indexed by the numbers in column  (in order).

The universal R-module  that extends  to a mapping of R-modules  is the image of E under the Schur functor indexed by λ.

For an example of the condition (3) placed on 
suppose that λ is the partition  and the tableau
T is numbered such that its entries are 1, 2, 3, 4, 5 when read
top-to-bottom (left-to-right). Taking  (i.e.,
the numbers in the second column of T) we have

 

while if  then

Examples 
Fix a vector space V over a field of characteristic zero. We identify partitions and the corresponding Young diagrams. The following descriptions hold:
 For a partition λ = (n)  the Schur functor Sλ(V) = Symn(V).
 For a partition λ = (1, ..., 1) (repeated n times) the Schur functor Sλ(V) = Λn(V).
 For a partition λ = (2, 1) the Schur functor Sλ(V) is the cokernel of the comultiplication map of exterior powers Λ3(V) → Λ2(V) ⊗ V.
 For a partition λ = (2, 2) the Schur functor Sλ(V) is the quotient of Λ2(V) ⊗ Λ2(V) by the images of two maps. One is the composition Λ3(V) ⊗ V → Λ2(V) ⊗ V ⊗ V → Λ2(V) ⊗ Λ2(V), where the first map is the comultiplication along the first coordinate. The other map is a comultiplication Λ4(V) → Λ2(V) ⊗ Λ2(V).
 For a partition λ = (n, 1, ..., 1), with 1 repeated m times,  the Schur functor Sλ(V) is the quotient of Λn(V) ⊗ Symm(V) by the image of the composition of the comultiplication in exterior powers and the multiplication in symmetric powers:

Applications 
Let V be a complex vector space of dimension k. It's a tautological representation of its automorphism group GL(V). If λ is a diagram where each row has no more than k cells, then Sλ(V) is an irreducible GL(V)-representation of highest weight λ. In fact, any rational representation of GL(V) is isomorphic to a direct sum of representations of the form Sλ(V) ⊗ det(V)⊗m, where λ is a Young diagram with each row strictly shorter than k, and m is any (possibly negative) integer.

In this context Schur-Weyl duality states that as a -module

 

where  is the number of standard young tableaux of shape λ. More generally, we have the decomposition of the tensor product as -bimodule

 

where  is the Specht module indexed by λ. Schur functors can also be used to describe the coordinate ring of certain flag varieties.

Plethysm 

For two Young diagrams λ and μ consider the composition of the corresponding Schur functors Sλ(Sμ(-)). This composition is called a plethysm of λ and μ. From the general theory it's known that, at least for vector spaces over a characteristic zero field, the plethysm is isomorphic to a direct sum of Schur functors. The problem of determining which Young diagrams occur in that description and how to calculate their multiplicities is open, aside from some special cases like Symm(Sym2(V)).

See also

Young symmetrizer
Schur polynomial
Littlewood–Richardson rule
Polynomial functor

References 

 J. Towber, Two new functors from modules to algebras, J. Algebra 47 (1977), 80-104. doi:10.1016/0021-8693(77)90211-3
 W. Fulton, Young Tableaux, with Applications to Representation Theory and Geometry. Cambridge University Press, 1997, .

External links 
 Schur Functors | The n-Category Café

Representation theory
Functors